The Upper Silesian Industrial Region (Polish abbreviation: GOP) is a large industrial region in Poland. It lies mainly in the Silesian Voivodeship, centered on Katowice.

It is situated in the northern part of Upper Silesian Coal Basin a home of altogether 5 million people (Silesian metropolitan area), the southwest border of the Rybnik Coal Area (Polish: Rybnicki Okręg Węglowy, ROW) and west borders with the Ostrava urban area. Covers 3,200 km² and about 3 million people.

The Upper Silesian Industrial Region is located in the province of Upper Silesia and Zagłębie Dąbrowskie in southern Poland in a basin between the Vistula and Oder rivers.

Upper Silesian Industrial Region is an area with enormous concentration of industry. Dominates here:
 Mining industry (more than a dozen active coal mines, mainly as Katowicki Holding Węglowy, Kompania Węglowa, JSW,Węglokoks
 Iron and steel industry (more than a dozen active iron and nonferrous metals)
 Transport industry (example General Motors Manufacturing Poland and Fiat Auto Poland, Konstal, Bumar Łabędy)
 The energy industry (more than a dozen plants)
 Mechanical engineering
 Chemical industry

See also
Upper Silesian Metropolis
Rybnik Coal Area

References

Literature
 "Katowice i Górnośląski Okręg Przemysłowy" - Krystyna Szaraniec & Lech Szaraniec & Karol Szarowski, Katowickie Towarzystwo Społeczno-Kulturalne, Katowice 1980
 "Górnośląski Okręg Przemysłowy: liczby, fakty, problemy" - Marek Grabania, Wydawnictwo Śląsk, Katowice 1964
 "Górnośląski Okręg Przemysłowy w świetle nowych opracowań zachodnioniemieckich" - Marian Frank, Silesian Institute in Katowice, Katowice 1960

Silesian Voivodeship
Economy of Poland